Manuchar I, or Manch I, from the house of Shervashidze, was a prince of the Principality of Abkhazia from circa 1730 to 1757. Manuchar was forcefully deposed from the throne by Ottoman Turkey and sent into exile to that empire, where he converted to Islam together with his brothers Levan, Shirvan and Zurab.

References

 Georgian State (Soviet) Encyclopedia. 1983. Book 10. p. 689.
 Lak'oba, S. (1999). 18th century-1917 in The Abkhazians; a handbook. Curzon Press, Richmond (England).

Princes of Abkhazia
House of Shervashidze
Converts to Islam from Eastern Orthodoxy
Former Georgian Orthodox Christians